The 38th Annual Japan Record Awards took place on December 31, 1996, starting at 6:30PM JST. The primary ceremonies were televised in Japan on TBS.

Award winners 
Japan Record Award:
Tetsuya Komuro (producer) & Namie Amuro for "Don't Wanna Cry"
Best Vocalist:
Yoshimi Tendo
Best New Artist:
Puffy AmiYumi
Best Album:
globe for "globe"

External links
Official Website

Japan Record Awards
Japan Record Awards
Japan Record Awards
Japan Record Awards
1996